Acanthocarpus preissii is a rhizomatous perennial that occurs on coastal dunes in Western Australia. White flowers appear between April and May in the species' native range.

References

preissii
Asparagales of Australia
Angiosperms of Western Australia
Taxa named by Johann Georg Christian Lehmann